Nicolas Maurice-Belay (born 19 April 1985) is French former professional footballer who played as a midfielder. He spent most of his career with FC Sochaux-Montbéliard and FC Girondins de Bordeaux.

Career
Maurice-Belay was born in Sucy-en-Brie, Val-de-Marne. He joined the Centre of Formation at Monaco in 2001 before making his first appearance in 2005. The following season he joined Sedan for one season on loan. In 2007, he joined FC Sochaux-Montbéliard remaining at the club for four seasons.

In June 2011 Maurice-Belay signed for FC Girondins de Bordeaux on a free-transfer. He left the club at the end of the 2016–17 season when his contract expired.

In February 2019, Maurice-Belay joined fourth-tier side Bergerac Périgord. He was reportedly approached after the chairman's son spotted that he was a free agent while playing the video game Football Manager 2019.

In autumn 2019, Maurice-Belay announced his retirement from playing.

Honours
Bordeaux
Coupe de France: 2012–13

References

External links

1985 births
Living people
People from Sucy-en-Brie
Footballers from Val-de-Marne
Association football midfielders
French footballers
French people of Martiniquais descent
Ligue 1 players
AS Monaco FC players
CS Sedan Ardennes players
FC Sochaux-Montbéliard players
FC Girondins de Bordeaux players
Bergerac Périgord FC players
French expatriate sportspeople in Monaco
Expatriate footballers in Monaco